Moggerhanger House is a Grade I-listed country house in Moggerhanger, Bedfordshire, England, designed by the eminent architect John Soane. The house is owned by a Christian charity, Harvest Vision, and the Moggerhanger House Preservation Trust, and has recently undergone a £7m refurbishment project with help from organisations such as the Heritage Lottery Fund, English Heritage, World Monuments Fund and the East of England Development Agency.

History 
The original house at Moggerhanger was small and of Georgian design. The house was acquired by Godfrey Thornton, a Bank of England director, who commissioned the Bank's architect, John Soane, to remodel it between 1790 and 1793. More substantial work would follow when Thornton's son Stephen inherited the house. Soane continued from 1806 until the scheme was completed in 1812 while the Bank of England reconstruction was under way. Soane remodelled Moggerhanger entirely, enlarging it to the west, relocating the entrance to the north and reproofing the house completely. He incorporated his previous work from 1793 maintaining symmetries and Classical axes. Soane experimented with decoration, using it as a prototype for future work.

As Ptolemy Dean notes, "with so much of the old fabric concealed by later finishes, it was little wonder that the importance of this building had been so under-recognised. The sense that this house and estate would soon emerge as one of Soane's key masterpieces was unimaginable."

The house was rendered by Soane using "Parker's Roman Cement" of biscuit-brown color. This was a new material, patented hydraulic lime render, of his time. The garden side of seven bays has a wooden veranda. In the centre is a shallow pediment on pilaster strips with sunk panels. The entrance has a low centre with a semicircular porch of Greek Doric columns of the Delos type. The end bays have on the ground floor arched windows with broad Grecian pediment over. Behind the porch is a square entrance hall once with a shallow dome. The window bars are painted dark grey, which causes the window detail to disappear so that pure shapes of openings are clearly visible appearing like punch recesses. Inside there is an all-cantilevered staircase with simple iron balustrade.

The gardens were designed by noted landscaper Humphry Repton. Only three other houses of Soane's are still standing: Pitzhanger Manor in Ealing, Tyringham Hall in Buckinghamshire, and Pell Wall Hall in Shropshire, plus the library at Stowe House in Buckinghamshire.

The house was used as a hospital for most of the 20th century. In 1919 it was opened as a TB isolation hospital, and then became an orthopedic hospital in the late 1950s. In 1960 it was renamed Park Hospital, but closed in 1987 when a new wing was built in Bedford Hospital. From that point the house went into a state of disrepair.

Restoration

The house was for sale for £1 in 1994 when it was noticed by neighbour Isabelle Hay, Countess of Erroll, who lives at nearby Woodbury Hall. Though the house was crumbling, it retained its original features. Its listing was upgraded from Grade II* to Grade I. "All the original woodwork, the doors, bits of decorative ceilings, mantels, flags and fireplace surrounds, remnants of wallpapers, were all still there," the countess said. "It is such a fine example – there isn't another like it."

Lady Erroll formed the Moggerhanger House Preservation Trust along with the Lord Lieutenant of Bedfordshire Sir Samuel Whitbread, and architect Peter Inskip.

The Heritage Lottery Fund donated £3.5 million toward the project, and by 2005 the expenditure had approached £7 million. "We keep finding new wonderful things which cost money to restore," Lady Erroll said in 2005. "We have had to make sacrifices, which is why the car park hasn't been done yet, the Repton grounds haven't been restored and we have no furniture."

Soane's lengthy relationship with the house provided a backdrop for him to experiment, said Inskip, the architect who oversaw the restoration.

"In the records you could see a friendship develop between architect and client over 40 years," Inskip said. "This allowed Soane to experiment, so there are things here that tell us about aspects of some of the buildings that were lost. Through the depth of research and unpicking we have revealed a great work of art which has been ignored for 100 years. Soane is up there with the great British architects – Inigo Jones, Wren, Hawksmoor."

The restoration project took 10 years to complete, and members of the local village and local churches volunteered help and support to complete the work and maintain the site whilst building contractors were working.

The present 
The house is now used as a conference and training centre for most of the year, but opens as a tourist attraction from mid-June to mid-September, during which time public tours are conducted twice daily.

Free access to the grounds is available throughout the year. There is a spacious tea room and children's play area within the grounds.

The house has become a centre of local community activities and its successful restoration has been a triumph for the local village and for Bedfordshire.

The Moggerhanger House Preservation Trust, a registered charity, is currently trying to secure funds to restore Humphrey Repton’s  parkland surrounding the house.

References

External links

Official Website

Country houses in Bedfordshire
Gardens in Bedfordshire
Grade I listed houses
Grade I listed buildings in Bedfordshire
John Soane buildings
Historic house museums in Bedfordshire